The women's 3000 metres event  at the 1990 European Athletics Indoor Championships was held in Kelvin Hall on 3 March.

Results

References

3000 metres at the European Athletics Indoor Championships
3000
1990 in women's athletics